The Sligo Senior Football Championship is an annual Gaelic Athletic Association club competition between the top Sligo clubs. The winners of the Sligo Senior Championship qualify to represent the county in the Connacht Senior Club Football Championship and in turn, go on to the All-Ireland Senior Club Football Championship. Tubbercurry remain the most successful club, having won the Championship on 20 occasions, the last in 2014. Tourlestrane won the 2022 competition, defeating St Mary's GAA in the final to win their eighteenth title, their seventh title in a row.

The trophy presented to the winners is the Owen B. Hunt Cup, which was first presented for the 1953 final.

Top winners

Finals listed by year

References

External links
 Sligo GAA 125 History (2010)
 Official Sligo Website
 Sligo on Hoganstand
 Sligo Club GAA

 
Senior Gaelic football county championships
1